Jordan Jovanović (born 27 January 1992) is a Serbian footballer, who plays as a midfielder for Železničar Pančevo.

References

External links
 
 Jordan Jovanović stats at utakmica.rs 
 

1992 births
Living people
People from Smederevska Palanka
Association football midfielders
Serbian footballers
FK BSK Borča players
FK Teleoptik players
FK Javor Ivanjica players
FK Mačva Šabac players
FK Radnički Pirot players
Serbian First League players
Serbian SuperLiga players